The 2022–23 season is Legia Warsaw's 106th season in existence and the club's 75th consecutive season in the top flight of Polish football. In addition to the domestic league, Legia Warsaw will participate in this season's edition of the Polish Cup. The season covers the period from 1 July 2022 to 30 June 2023.

Players

First-team squad

Out on loan

Pre-season and friendlies

Competitions

Overview

Ekstraklasa

League table

Results summary

Results by round

Matches
The league fixtures were announced on 1 June 2022.

Polish Cup

Statistics

Goalscorers

References

Legia Warsaw seasons
Legia Warsaw